Suzie or Susie is a feminine given name, and is a short form (hypocorism) of Suzanne, Susannah or Susan.

Notable people with this given name include:

People
 Suzannah Suzie Bates (born 1987), New Zealand cricketer
 Suzie Brasher (born 1960 or 1961), American former figure skater, 1976 World Junior champion
 Suzie d'Auvergne (1942–2014), Saint Lucian barrister and jurist
 Suzanne Suzie Faulkner (born 1979), Australian field hockey player
 Suzannah Suzie Fraser (born 1983), Australian water polo player
 Suzie Higgie, lead singer, guitarist and songwriter of the Australian alternative rock band Falling Joys
 Suzanne Suzie Kitson (born 1969), English former cricketer
 Suzie LeBlanc (born 1961), Canadian soprano and early music specialist
 Suzie McConnell-Serio (born 1966), American women's basketball coach and former player
 Susan Suzie McNeil (born 1976), Canadian singer and songwriter
 Suzie Pierrepont (born 1985), English professional squash player
 Susan Suzie Plakson (born 1958), American actress
 Suzanah Suzie Templeton (born 1967), English animator
 Suzie Toase, British actress 
 Suzie Vinnick, Canadian roots and blues singer, songwriter and guitarist
 Suzie Zuzek (1920-2011), American textile designer

Fictional characters
Suzie Costello, antagonist and one-time protagonist of the television series Torchwood
Suzie Wong (disambiguation), several characters
Suzie, Dustin Henderson's girlfriend in Stranger Things

See also
 Suzie River, a tributary of the Mégiscane River in Quebec, Canada
 Susie (disambiguation)
 Susy (disambiguation)
 Suzy (given name)

Feminine given names
Hypocorisms